The Margolin Hebrew Academy is a co-educational school located in East Memphis, Tennessee. It is the only Orthodox Jewish day school in Memphis. The MHA/FYOS comprises the Margolin Hebrew Academy, a pre-kindergarten through 8th grade section, with the Feinstone Yeshiva of the South, including Cooper Yeshiva High School for Boys, and the Goldie Margolin High School for Girls.

The head of school for the PK-12th grades is Rabbi Yisroel Weiner.

Athletics 

The school offers basketball, soccer, cross country, flag football, golf, and baseball. The team name is the Maccabees (shortened to the "Macs," carrying a Jewish background as the team bases its name off of the Jewish soldiers in the war against the Greeks). The varsity high school girls and boys teams play in Division II of the TSSAA league.

Goldie Margolin High School for Girls
The Goldie Margolin High School for Girls (GMSG) was established in 1964 as an extension of the former Memphis Hebrew Academy, created in response to a community and regional need for an Orthodox Jewish high school for girls. The current principal is Sara Plotitsa.

Cooper Yeshiva High School for Boys
The CYHSB was founded in 1966 as the Feinstone Yeshiva of the South, and was changed to the CYHSB in 1993, but kept the FYOS name for the elementary school and part of the high school. The current principal is Rabbi Yonason Gersten.

Boarding
It includes a boarding facility.

References

Private K-12 schools in Tennessee
Jewish schools in the United States
Schools in Memphis, Tennessee
Boarding schools in Tennessee